Saligny-le-Vif is a former commune in the Cher department in the Centre-Val de Loire region of France. On 1 January 2019, it was merged into the commune Baugy.

Geography

Population

Sights
 The church of St. Pierre, dating from the twelfth century.
 A feudal motte.

See also
Communes of the Cher department

References

Former communes of Cher (department)
Populated places disestablished in 2019
Berry, France